A Romance in Flanders is a 1937 British drama film directed by Maurice Elvey and starring Paul Cavanagh, Marcelle Chantal, Olga Lindo and Alastair Sim. It is set during the First World War with the British Expeditionary Force in Flanders. It was also released under the alternative title of Lost on the Western Front.

It was made at the Riverside Studios in Hammersmith by the independent Franco-London Films. Halliwell's Film Guide describes it as "rose-coloured romantic hokum".

Cast
 Paul Cavanagh as John Morley 
 Marcelle Chantal as Yvonne Berry  
 Garry Marsh as Rodd Berry  
 Olga Lindo as Madame Vlandermaere  
 Alastair Sim as Colonel Wexton 
 Evelyn Roberts as Captain Stanford  
 Kynaston Reeves as Major Burke  
 Arthur Hambling as Colonel Kennedy  
 C. Denier Warren as Bill Johnson 
 Frank Atkinson as Joe Stuggins  
 Bobbie Comber as Chauffeur 
 Andreas Malandrinos as Mayor  
 Denise Sydney as Muriel  
 Kathleen Weston as Bessie  
 Muriel Pavlow

References

Bibliography
 Halliwell, Leslie. Halliwell's Film Guide. Scribner, 1989.
 Low, Rachael. Filmmaking in 1930s Britain. George Allen & Unwin, 1985.
 Wood, Linda. British Films, 1927-1939. British Film Institute, 1986.

External links

1937 films
Films directed by Maurice Elvey
Western Front (World War I) films
1937 drama films
Films set in Flanders
1930s English-language films
British drama films
Films shot at Riverside Studios
Films set in the 1910s
British black-and-white films
1930s British films